Coprobolus is a fungal genus in the family Thelebolaceae. It is a monotypic genus, containing the single species Coprobolus poculiformis. It was first described scientifically in 1970. C. poculiformis has hyaline ellipsoid ascosporess and multispored asci that split open at the apex. It was found on rabbit dung.

References

Monotypic Leotiomycetes genera